Anthony Charles Bartley,  (28 March 1919 – 18 April 2001) was a British film and television executive, and fighter pilot. As a Royal Air Force (RAF) Spitfire pilot, Bartley was awarded the Distinguished Flying Cross for his actions during the Battle of Britain, during which he became a fighter ace.

Early life
Bartley was born in Dacca, India, on 28 March 1919, the son of an Irish barrister, Sir Charles Bartley, a Calcutta High Court judge.

Bartley attended Stowe School, a boarding independent school for boys in the civil parish of Stowe, in Buckinghamshire.

RAF career
In 1938, Bartley learned to fly. He was commissioned as an acting pilot officer in the Royal Air Force on 18 April 1939; this rank was made permanent, albeit on probation, on 21 October 1939.

He flew with No. 92 Squadron through the Battle of France, seeing action over Dunkirk, and then during Battle of Britain, and was awarded the Distinguished Flying Cross (DFC) in October 1940, by which time he had been credited with shooting down "at least eight enemy aircraft".

After serving in No. 74 Squadron in early 1941, Bartley undertook an instructional role at several operational training units before undertaking a role as a test pilot at Vickers Supermarine in July 1941. In early 1942, he returned to operational flying, being posted No. 65 Squadron; initially, he filled the role of flight commander, but later took command of the squadron in May 1942. In August 1942, he took command of No. 111 Squadron, and led them during Operation Torch, in North Africa, until January 1943. For his service in North Africa, he received a bar to his DFC in February 1943.

After returning to the United Kingdom, he then served on the staff of No. 83 Group RAF, before departing in October 1944 for the US to attend the Command and General Staff College, and then at the School of Air Tactics. His next posting was as a liaison officer to the 70th Fighter Wing. In October 1944 he joined RAF Transport Command in the Far East.

At the end of the war Bartley's combat total included 12 (and 1 shared) destroyed, 1 unconfirmed destroyed, 5 'probables' and 8 'damaged'.

On 19 November 2021, it was announced that the seven medals Bartley received for his wartime service would be auctioned by Dix Noonan Webb in London in December 2021.

Film industry
Following his demobilisation in 1946, Bartley returned to Vickers-Armstrong, where he worked as both a sales executive and a test pilot. After marrying actress Deborah Kerr in November 1945, he later moved to Hollywood, having met her when she shared a flat with his elder sister, Patricia Bartley, who had worked at Bletchley Park during the war as a codebreaker. His post war work in the film industry included roles in the United States, Canada, Barbados and Ireland, and included the establishment of several companies, writing and producing films for television, work in sales and production and executive roles.

Personal life
Bartley and Kerr had two daughters, Francesca and Melanie. Through Francesca they have three grandsons, actors Lex Shrapnel and Tom Shrapnel as well as the writer Joe Shrapnel. Bartley and Kerr divorced in 1959 and he married again in 1965 to Victoria Mann.

Bartley died in 2001. He was survived by Mann and their two daughters, Cindy and Teresa. Mann passed away in 2019.

Bibliography
Bartley, Anthony. (1984). Smoke Trails in the Sky. William Kimber. 
Bartley, Tony. (1997). Smoke Trails in the Sky: The Journals of a Battle of Britain Fighter Pilot. Crecy Publishing Ltd; 2nd edition.

References

External links

 Autobiography "Smoke Trails in the Sky" (1984)
 "The Daily Telegraph" Obituary
 Imperial War Museum Interview
  Memorial Notice for Victoria Bartley

1919 births
2001 deaths
British World War II flying aces
English aviators
People educated at Stowe School
Recipients of the Distinguished Flying Cross (United Kingdom)
Royal Air Force squadron leaders
Royal Air Force pilots of World War II
The Few
People from Dhaka
British people in colonial India